ACWS-United Broadcasting Network is a broadcast media company in the Philippines. It owns several radio stations in areas, as well as its focus on the Multipoint Video Distribution System (MVDS) for wireless broadcast distribution.

History
ACWS was established by the Hodreal family in the 1960s. It obtained its Congressional franchise in 1969 when Republic Act No. 4551 was transferred from the Villaverde group.

It established DWBC-AM (then at 920 KHz) and its FM station counterpart in 1972, the year when the Philippines was under Martial Law. In 1980, DWBC-FM became DWRK (RK 96) and in 1988, relaunched under the new branding known as WRocK.

On July 27, 1999, ACWS-UBN launched its first television station known as UltraVision 25. The station, however, was short-lived and became the subject of a legal dispute when ACWS-UBN filed a case against the National Telecommunications Commission (NTC). In February 2009, the Supreme Court affirmed the case.

On February 28, 2003, Republic Act No. 9192 signed by then-Philippine President Gloria Macapagal Arroyo which renewed ACWS-UBN's license for another 25 years. The law granted ACWS-UBN a franchise to construct, install, establish, operate and maintain for commercial purposes and in the public interest, radio and/or television broadcasting stations in the Philippines.

On October 6, 2008, it has been announced that the Elizalde Group of Companies' Manila Broadcasting Company (MBC) has purchased WRocK from the Hodreal family, owners of ACWS-UBN, for PhP229.6 million.  Except for the acquisition price, further terms were not disclosed.

While the Manila radio station (DWRK – rebranded to 96.3 Easy Rock) is under the control of MBC, ACWS-UBN (and then-sister firm Exodus Broadcasting Company) retained control of the WRocK provincial stations until in 2010 when it suspended its operations except the Exodus-owned Cebu station being remained.

In 2015, a new group of investors acquired ACWS-UBN from the Hodreal family. Since under the new ownership, the company obtained 2 FM stations under a provisional authority (but has since not yet to be operational), as the company proposes to enter joint-venture franchise agreements with various 3rd-parties to invest and operate thru either community radio and public broadcast. It also began resuming its television broadcast business through its engagement in MVDS for wireless distribution.

List of stations

Current stations

Former stations

Radio

Television

References

Mass media companies of the Philippines
Companies based in Makati
Privately held companies of the Philippines